The Great Plains Shelterbelt was a project to create windbreaks in the Great Plains states of the United States, that began in 1934. President Franklin D. Roosevelt initiated the project in response to the severe dust storms of the Dust Bowl, which resulted in significant soil erosion and drought. The United States Forest Service believed that planting trees on the perimeters of farms would reduce wind velocity and lessen evaporation of moisture from the soil. By 1942, 220 million trees had been planted, covering  in a 100-mile-wide zone from Canada to the Brazos River. Even , "the federal response to the Dust Bowl, including the Prairie States Forestry Project which planted the Great Plains Shelterbelt and creation of the Soil Erosion Service, represents the largest and most-focused effort of the [U.S.] government to address an environmental problem".

History

The "Number One Shelterbelt" is located in Greer County, in southwestern Oklahoma. Oklahoma's first State Forester, George R. Phillips, had the distinction of planting the very first tree in the federal program's very first shelterbelt in 1935." The first tree was an Austrian pine planted on the H.E. Curtis farm near Willow, Oklahoma, on March 18.

The project called for large-scale planting of trees across the Great Plains, stretching in a 100-mile wide zone from Canada to northern Texas, to protect the land from wind erosion. Native trees, such as red cedar and green ash, were planted along fence rows separating properties, and farmers were paid to plant and cultivate them. The project was estimated to cost $75 million over 12 years. When disputes arose over funding sources (the project was considered to be a long-term strategy and therefore ineligible for emergency relief funds), FDR transferred the program to the WPA.

The Great Plains Shelterbelt was allowed under the 1924 Clarke–McNary Act and was carried out by the Works Progress Administration (WPA). Project headquarters were in Lincoln, Nebraska, and Raphael Zon served as the technical director. The U.S. Forest Service and Civilian Conservation Corps assisted. "The Shelterbelt Program of 1935–1942 ... [was] later known as the Prairie States Forestry Project."

By 1942, 30,233 shelterbelts had been planted, which contained 220 million trees and covered .

Restoration efforts in the 21st century
, "Many shelterbelts in Kansas and throughout the central Great Plains are old and are no longer providing the benefits that they used to", according to Kansas State Forester Larry Biles.

 in Nebraska,

In 2010, federal grants were made available for shelterbelt maintenance and restoration in Kansas, North Dakota, South Dakota, and Nebraska as part of the Central Great Plains Shelterbelt Renovation and the Central Great Plains Forested Riparian Buffer CCPI proposals. Funding for the CCPI (Cooperative Conservation Partnership Initiative) is provided as a project of the Department of Agriculture's Natural Resources Conservation Service.

See also

 Afforestation
 Agroforestry
 Buffer strip
 Desertification
 Ecological engineering
 Ecological engineering methods
 Ecotechnology
 Energy-efficient landscaping
 Great Plan for the Transformation of Nature
 Hedge
 Human ecology
 Macro-engineering
 Proposed sahara forest project
 Protection forest
 Sand fence
 Sustainable agriculture
 Windbreak

References

Notes

Further reading
  A fuller account of the Great Plains Shelterbelt, describing its limitations and its successes, with a history of the development of forestry in the Plains
 Illustration and description of a typical farmstead shelterbelt in South Dakota

External links

 The Prairie States Forestry Project (1940) at the Internet Archive
 Prairie States Forestry Project in Kansas - Part 1, Historical video footage from the Kansas Forest Service
 Prairie States Forestry Project in Kansas - Part 2 Historical video footage from the Kansas Forest Service

Works Progress Administration
Conservation projects in the United States
Great Plains
Dust Bowl
Works Progress Administration in Nebraska
Works Progress Administration in Oklahoma
Works Progress Administration in Kansas
Works Progress Administration in North Dakota
Works Progress Administration in South Dakota
History of forestry in the United States
Works Progress Administration in Texas
United States Forest Service